James John Buchanan French (born 31 December 1907) was a Scottish footballer who made 22 appearances in the Football League playing as an inside forward for Gillingham and Clapton Orient in the 1930s.

References

1907 births
Footballers from North Lanarkshire
Scottish footballers
Association football inside forwards
Airdrieonians F.C. (1878) players
Gillingham F.C. players
Montrose F.C. players
Leyton Orient F.C. players
Scottish Football League players
English Football League players
Year of death missing